FC Järfälla is a Swedish football club located in Järfälla.

Background
FC Järfälla currently plays in Division 2 Norra Svealand which is the third tier of Swedish football. They play their home matches at the Järfällavallen in Järfälla.

The club is affiliated to Stockholms Fotbollförbund.

Season to season

Footnotes

External links
 FC Järfälla – Official website

Football clubs in Stockholm
1993 establishments in Sweden
Association football clubs established in 1993